En gång till may refer to:

 Swedish for the phrase "One more time"
 En gång till (Lotta & Anders Engbergs orkester album), 1990
 "En gång till" (song), the title song
 En gång till (KSMB album), 1993
 En gång till (TV4), a TV-programme on TV4